The Bulgaria men's national under-20 basketball team is a national basketball team of Bulgaria, administered by the Bulgarian Basketball Federation. It represents the country in international men's under-20 basketball competitions.

FIBA U20 European Championship participations

See also
Bulgaria men's national basketball team
Bulgaria men's national under-18 basketball team
Bulgaria women's national under-20 basketball team

References

External links
Archived records of Bulgaria team participations

Basketball in Bulgaria
Basketball
Men's national under-20 basketball teams